Vadims Mikuckis (born 10 June 1971) is a retired Latvian football midfielder.

References

1971 births
Living people
Latvian footballers
KSK Vigri Tallinn players
Skonto FC players
Valmieras FK players
Association football midfielders
Latvia international footballers
Latvian expatriate footballers
Expatriate footballers in Estonia
Latvian expatriate sportspeople in Estonia
Expatriate soccer players in Australia
Latvian expatriate sportspeople in Australia
Sportspeople from Liepāja